Mutambara may refer to:

Places
 Mutambara, Manicaland, a village in Zimbabwe
 Mutambara, Burundi, a city in southwest Burundi

People
 Arthur Mutambara (born 1966), Zimbabwean politician

See also
 Mutamba Milambo (born 1984), Congolese football midfielder